Rockland Township is a civil township of Ontonagon County in the U.S. state of Michigan. The population was 226 at the 2020 census.

Communities
The Rockland Mine opened in 1847 and a post office named Rockland opened in January 1853 and closed in September 1860. A post office also opened at Minesota Mine in May 1857, which was renamed to National in March 1861. In December 1863, the National post office was changed to Rockford. A settlement named Rosendale was laid out by the Minesota Mining Company in 1858. Another settlement named Williamsburg was platted by William Sheppard and William Davey. A third settlement named Webster was platted by James Cooper. The three adjacent plats were consolidated into Rockland in 1864. Rockland has its own post office with the 49960 ZIP Code.
A post office was established September 1899. The village was abandoned after the mine closed in 1921, although the post office operated until December 1935. Like some other mines in the area, Victoria Mine was financed by British interests and was named for Queen Victoria.

Geography

Demographics
As of the census of 2000, there were 324 people, 134 households, and 90 families residing in the township.  The population density was 3.5 per square mile (1.3/km).  There were 215 housing units at an average density of 2.3 per square mile (0.9/km).  The racial makeup of the township was 97.84% White, 0.31% African American, 0.93% Native American, 0.62% Asian, and 0.31% from two or more races. Hispanic or Latino of any race were 0.31% of the population.

There were 134 households, out of which 26.9% had children under the age of 18 living with them, 50.7% were married couples living together, 9.7% had a female householder with no husband present, and 32.1% were non-families. 26.9% of all households were made up of individuals, and 14.2% had someone living alone who was 65 years of age or older.  The average household size was 2.37 and the average family size was 2.85.

In the township the population was spread out, with 20.4% under the age of 18, 5.9% from 18 to 24, 27.8% from 25 to 44, 28.1% from 45 to 64, and 17.9% who were 65 years of age or older.  The median age was 43 years. For every 100 females, there were 102.5 males.  For every 100 females age 18 and over, there were 98.5 males.

The median income for a household in the township was $32,250, and the median income for a family was $40,625. Males had a median income of $30,938 versus $27,500 for females. The per capita income for the township was $19,319.  About 2.4% of families and 9.0% of the population were below the poverty line, including 8.6% of those under age 18 and 7.5% of those age 65 or over.

Notable people
 Jack Carkeek, a famous pro wrestler of the late 19th century, was born in Rockland.
 Joseph G. Pinten, Roman Catholic bishop, was born in Rockland.

References

External links

Townships in Ontonagon County, Michigan
Townships in Michigan